Lao-Korean College is a college in Vientiane, the capital city of Laos, founded in 2012. The college has four Departments: Department of English, Department of Korean, Department of Accounting, and Department of IT. The college is supported by two nations, Laos and Korea.

Lao-Korean College is located in Phonsavarthnuea Village, Sikhottabong district, Vientiane Capital City, Laos.

Universities in Laos
Vientiane